State legislative assembly may refer to 

 State legislative assemblies of India
 State legislative assemblies of Malaysia